Shimizu may refer to:

People
 Shimizu (surname) (清水, "clear" or "pure water"), a common Japanese surname

Places

Japan
Shimizu, Fukui -chō, town, Fukui Prefecture
Shimizu, Shizuoka -chō, town, Shizuoka Prefecture
Shimizu-ku, Shizuoka, ward of the city of Shizuoka
Shimizu, Wakayama -chō, town, Wakayama Prefecture
Shimizu, Hokkaido -chō, town, Hokkaidō
Tosashimizu, Kōchi, Kōchi Prefecture

Other places
Qingshui District, named Shimizu under Japanese rule, district of Taichung, Taiwan

Other uses 
Shimizu S-Pulse, J. League soccer/football team based in Shizuoka
Shimizu Mega-City Pyramid, a building envisioned for construction in Tokyo
Shimizu Corporation, an architectural, engineering and general contracting firm
Shimizu-Tokugawa, a branch of the Tokugawa clan in Japan

See also
Clearwater (disambiguation), an English equivalent
Clear River (disambiguation), an English equivalent
Qingshui (disambiguation), the Chinese equivalent
Shimizu Station (disambiguation)